The 1933 Santa Clara Broncos football team was an American football team that represented Santa Clara University as an independent during the 1933 college football season. In their fifth season under head coach Maurice J. "Clipper" Smith, the Broncos compiled a 6–2–1 record and outscored opponents by a total of 101 to 40. 

Key players included quarterback Joe Morey, halfbacks Bill Denser, Vin O'Connell, and Chuck Fuller, and fullback "Diamond Joe" Paglia.

Schedule

References

Santa Clara
Santa Clara Broncos football seasons
Santa Clara Broncos football